Safipur is a town and nagar panchayat in Unnao district in the Indian state of Uttar Pradesh. Located 27 km northwest of the city of Unnao, Safipur serves as a tehsil headquarters and is well-connected by roads to nearby towns. Founded in the 1300s and originally called Saipur, the town's present name of Safipur is in honour of the 16th-century Muslim saint Makhdum Shah Safi, whose dargah is located here. Important commodities manufactured in Safipur today include steel boxes and almirahs, furniture, and incense sticks. As of 2011, Safipur's population is 25,688, in 4,288 households.

History 
Safipur was originally founded in the 1300s by a Brahmin named Sai Sukul, who was a subject of the Raja of Ugu. The town was formerly called Saipur in Sai Sukul's honour; the name Saipur was still the more common name in general use as late as the early 1900s. Sai Sukul supposedly died in battle in 1389 when Ibrahim Sharqi of the Jaunpur Sultanate conquered the town. Ibrahim then put his own lieutenants in charge of Saipur: Maulvi Akram, the ancestor of Makhdum Shah Safi; the paymaster Rao Mahesh Rao, whose descendants held the office of qanungo; the risaldar Sayyid Mir, whose descendants were zamindars; and Sayyid Hasan Reza, whose descendants were taluqdars and zamindars.

Maulvi Akram's great-grandson, Makhdum Shah Safi, was a religious mendicant who lived at Saipur during the 1500s. When he died, he was buried here, and the town's name was changed to Safipur in his honour. The mausoleum of Makhdum Shah Safi, as well as the surrounding dargah complex, was built by a follower of his named Chaudhri Khaslat Husain, who was the taluqdar of Sandila. A large mosque was added to the complex in the early 1900s by Chaudhri Muhammad Azim, who was also taluqdar of Sandila. Makhdum Shah Safi's dargah is the most important in Safipur, although there are several others, including those of Ifhamullah, Kudratullah, Hafizullah, and Abdullah.

Safipur was mentioned as the capital of a pargana in the Ain-i-Akbari; it maintained this status into the 20th century.

Two high-ranking officials under the Nawabs of Awadh, Diwan Umed Rai and Maulvi Fazl Azim, were natives of Safipur. They both had various buildings constructed in the town: Diwan Umed Rai built a bazaar and a sarai, and Maulvi Fazl Azim built many wells, mosques, and an imambara.

At the turn of the 20th century, Safipur was described as "a flourishing, well-built town" with a daily standing market and bazaars held twice weekly in four muhallas. It contained the tehsil headquarters, a police station, a munsif's court, a dispensary, and a middle school attended by 146 students.

Demographics 

According to the Indian census of 2001, Safipur had a population of 22,378. Males constitute 52% of the population and females 48%. In Safipur, 17% of the population is under 6 years of age.

According to the 2011 census, Safipur has a population of 25,688 people, in 4,288 households. The town's sex ratio is 932 females to every 1000 males;  13,299 of Safipur's residents are male and 12,389 are female. Among the 0-6 age group, the sex ratio is 940, which is higher than the district urban average. Members of Scheduled Castes make up 13.77% of the town's population, while no members of scheduled tribes were recorded. The town's literacy rate was 60.9% (counting only people age 7 and up); literacy was higher among men and boys (66.8%) than among women and girls (54.5%).

In terms of employment, 21.8% of Safipur residents were classified as main workers (i.e. people employed for at least 6 months per year) in 2011. Marginal workers (i.e. people employed for less than 6 months per year) made up 10.8%, and the remaining 67.4% were non-workers. Employment status varied heavily according to gender, with 51.2% of men being either main or marginal workers, compared to only 12.6% of women.

Villages 
Safipur CD block has the following 116 villages:

See also
Salindh

References

Cities and towns in Unnao district